Vilandakandam is a village in the Kumbakonam taluk of Thanjavur district, Tamil Nadu.

Demographics 

As per the 2001 census, Vilandakandam had a total population of 1589 with 751 males and 838 females. The sex ratio was 1116. The literacy rate was 64.63.

References 

 

Villages in Thanjavur district